The 1958–59 Hong Kong First Division League season was the 48th since its establishment.

League table

References
1958–59  Hong Kong First Division table (RSSSF)

Hong Kong First Division League seasons
Hong
football